Cleveland Municipal Airport  is a general aviation airport located 4 miles northeast of  Cleveland, Texas, United States.

The designated Area Control Center (ARTCC) is Houston Air Route Traffic Control Center.

References

External links
 Transportation in Cleveland, Texas
 The Economic Impact of Cleveland Municipal Airport

Airports in Greater Houston
Buildings and structures in Liberty County, Texas
Transportation in Liberty County, Texas